In several English-speaking countries, niggerhead or nigger head is a former name for several things thought to resemble the head of a black person (cf. "nigger"). The name is now taboo in normal usage.

The term was once widely used for all sorts of things, including nautical bollards and consumer products including soap, chewing tobacco, stove polish, canned oysters and shrimp, golf tees, and toy cap pistols, among others. It was often used for geographic features such as hills and rocks and geological objects such as geodes. The term appears in several US patents for mechanical devices prior to about 1950. Languages other than English have used similar terms to describe chocolate-coated marshmallow treats.

In 1955, the Aughinbaugh Canning Company of Mississippi renamed its "Nigger Head Brand" oysters to "Negro Head Brand" following pressure from the National Association for the Advancement of Colored People. More than a hundred "Niggerheads", and other place names now considered racially offensive, were changed in 1962 by the U.S. Board on Geographic Names, but many local names remained unchanged.

In October 2011, while Rick Perry was running for president of the United States, controversial reports that his family leased a hunting camp once called "Niggerhead" caused his record on racial issues to be scrutinized.

In August 2021, a large boulder at University of Wisconsin–Madison was removed after protests by students. The Black Student Union petitioned the university to remove the rock because it had once been described in a 1925 Wisconsin State Journal article as a "niggerhead."

See also
Use of nigger in proper names
List of rock formations that resemble human beings

References

External links

English toponyms
English words
Anti-African and anti-black slurs